Sandra Bernal (born 9 July 1999) is a Polish sports shooter. She competed in the women's trap event at the 2020 Summer Olympics.

References

External links
 

1999 births
Living people
Polish female sport shooters
Olympic shooters of Poland
Shooters at the 2020 Summer Olympics
Sportspeople from Wrocław
21st-century Polish women